Cristian Baz (born 5 May 1987) is an Argentinian professional footballer. Baz can play as a midfielder or as a striker.

Career
On 28 June 2010, Baz, along with fellow Argentinean Agustín Battipiedi, signed one-year contracts with Brighton & Hove Albion after departing Argentine Third Division side Comunicaciones.

In May 2011, the club announced that he would be released at the end of the season following the ending of his current contract, along with five other players.

Honours

Brighton & Hove Albion
Football League One: 2010–11

References

External links

1987 births
Living people
Argentine footballers
Brighton & Hove Albion F.C. players
English Football League players
Association football midfielders
Footballers from Buenos Aires